The Byvågåsane Peaks are three low aligned rock peaks which surmount the east shore of Byvågen Bay on the east side of Lutzow-Holm Bay. They were mapped by Norwegian cartographers from air photos taken by the Lars Christensen Expedition, 1936–37 and named Byvågåsane (the town bay peaks) in association with Byvågen Bay.

It was surveyed by the Japanese Antarctic Research Expedition, 1957–62, and named Bōzu-san (treeless peak).

It was surveyed by JARE and named Tankobu-san (craggy peak).

References

Mountains of Queen Maud Land
Prince Harald Coast